Broadview Hotel may refer to the following places:
Broadview Hotel (East St. Louis, Illinois), listed on the National Register of Historic Places
Broadview Hotel (Wichita, Kansas), listed on the National Register of Historic Places
Broadview Hotel (Toronto) (previously New Broadview House Hotel) in Toronto, Canada
Broadview Hotel (Emporia, Kansas) in Emporia, Kansas